The  was held on 3 February 2002 in Kannai Hall, Yokohama, Kanagawa.

Awards
 Best Film: Go
 Best Actor: Yōsuke Kubozuka – Go, Oboreru Sakana
 Best Supporting Actor: Tsutomu Yamazaki – Go, The Guys from Paradise, Go Heat Man!, Jogakusei no Tomo
 Best Supporting Actress:
Kou Shibasaki – Go, Battle Royale
Yūki Amami – Rendan, Inugami
 Best Director: Isao Yukisada – Go
 Best New Director:
Masahiko Nagasawa – Koko ni Iru Koto
Shin Togashi – Off-Balance
 Best Screenplay: Kankurō Kudō – Go
 Best Cinematography: Naoki Kayano – Onmyoji
 Best New Talent:
Takato Hosoyamada – Go, All About Lily Chou-Chou
Hitomi Manaka – Koko ni Iru Koto
Megumi Hatachiya – Off-Balance
 Special Prize: Shinji Sōmai (Career)

Best 10 
 Go
 Waterboys
 Battle Royale
 Spirited Away
 All About Lily Chou-Chou
 Kazahana
 Eureka
 Crayon Shin-chan: The Storm Called: The Adult Empire Strikes Back
 Rendan
 Koko ni Iru Koto, Off-Balance, Turn

References

Yokohama Film Festival
Y
Y
2002 in Japanese cinema
February 2002 events in Japan